The Griffin Hotel is located in the English town of Attleborough in the county of Norfolk. It has been a Grade II listed building since the 21 July 1951.

Location 
The hotel is located on Church Street in the centre of the town. The hotel is next to, and overlooks the parish church of the Assumption of the Blessed Virgin Mary.

History 
The first inn on this site opened its doors to travelers in 1560 during the early part of the reign of Queen Elizabeth I. The original inn is located in the front of the building facing on to Church Street. The hotel was extended in the 17th and 18th centuries with and this part of the buildings frontage faces east towards the parish church. By this time the Griffin had become a busy coaching inn. An interesting feature of the archway and courtyard were the use of wooden cobbles installed to muffle the horse's hooves, so as not to disturb the guests sleeping upstairs.

References 

Attleborough
Coaching inns
Grade II listed buildings in Norfolk
Grade II listed hotels
Hotels in Norfolk
Companies established in the 1560s
1560 establishments in England